Reedley High School was established in 1918 as the first public high school in Reedley, California, and in the Kings Canyon Unified School District. It boasts one of the largest marching bands on the West Coast. Every year, Reedley High hosts a CMEA Music Festival.

Admissions

Approximately 1,836 students attend Reedley High. The racial makeup of the school is 47% White, >1% Black or African American, >1% Native American, 2% Asian, 1% Filipino, and 1% from other races.  48% of the population is Hispanic or Latino.

Athletics

The school's mascot is the Mighty Pirate also known as Pete the Pirate. The RHS school colors are Kelly green and white. Reedley High School participates as a Div. II school in the CIF Central Section and plays in the North Yosemite League (NYL). It has won many CIF Div. II championships, and its cross country team is persistently dominant. Sports at RHS include:

Each Reedley High School athletic department has its own Twitter account to provide updates on the latest sporting event news:

RHS Main Athletics Page: @ReedleyHSSports

RHS Baseball: @ReedleyBaseball

RHS Basketball (Boys): @reedleyhoops

RHS Softball:

RHS Basketball (Girls):

RHS Football: @ReedleyHS_FB

RHS Wrestling:

RHS Soccer (Boys): @RHSBoysSoccer15 

RHS Soccer (Girls):

RHS Water Polo:

RHS Swim:

RHS Volleyball (Boys):

RHS Volleyball (Girls):

RHS Tennis:

RHS Badminton:

RHS Track and Field:

RHS Cross Country:

The Reedley High Soccer team did not win state, however they won Central Section Valley Championships with Eric Velarde as the Varsity head coach of the Reedley Pirates Soccer Team for the 2017-2018 season. During their journey to State, they faced the Sotomayor Wolves and lost to them. During their journey to Valley, they faced the Redwood Rangers and won the Central Section Valley Championship game.

Academics

Courses

Reedley High School gives students many course options. From basic classes such as English 9 to creative classes such as Children's Literature, Chicano Literature, American Literature, English Literature, and Creative Prose & Poetry. The school offers many electives, including VROP classes that offer hands-on career experience such as Video Production, Computer Graphics and Design, Woodshop, Automotive Mechanics, Floral Design, Virtual Enterprise, On Your Own, Fashion, Microsoft Certification, Photography, Veterinary Science, Peer Counseling, Student Council, Fitness and Conditioning, and a number of other specialty classes. RHS also offers many AP classes and Honors classes ranging from English to Calculus and to French. There are also many active academic clubs and activities throughout the campus.

NJROTC

One club/class, on the Reedley High Campus that contributes much potential success and leadership ability to students is the Naval Junior Reserve Officer Training Corps (NJROTC), which is located within Area 11. One of just a few other ROTC programs, this class is conducted by retired naval personnel, a senior naval science instructor (SNSI), and a naval science instructor (NSI), which is determined by the rank given within their time served in the navy. Between 2001 and 2006 Master Chief James Okray (SNSI) and Chief Petty Officer Joseph Arruda (NSI), alongside their students, upheld their classes to their fullest potential. The fourth year of the class normally consists of ranking officers teaching the third, second, and first years how to gain leadership ability and military knowledge. In 2006, Master Chief Okray moved on to bigger and better things, leaving RHS with a new SNSI. Reedley High gained Lt. Commander David J.Brunkhorst, who served 25 years in the navy and retired in 2006 to teach at Reedley High School alongside Chief Petty Officer Joseph Arruda. In the year 2006/2007 the unit won an Outstanding Achievement for Area 11. In 2007 Lt. Commander David J Brunkhorst left the school, as did fellow Chief Petty Officer Joseph Arruda, leaving the Reedley High NJROTC program to settle with two more teachers, little did this unit know Master Chief James Okray (NSI) would come back to teach, the unit also gained Warrant Officer Daryl Stocking (SNSI) from the Parlier ROTC program in the 2007/2008 school year. The program has proven to have one of the best shooting teams in the West.

Band

The school's music program has also been very successful. The majority of the program's students have never taken any type of private lessons. The marching band competes in many festivals and always seems to be the favorite or most talked about. The band's biggest competition is the annual Selma Band Review.  In 2000, the marching band consisted of 415 members and was personally invited to participate in the 2000 Rose Parade. The Band's 325 members regularly tour Northern and Southern California and have participated in the Hollywood Christmas Parade, the Disneyland Christmas Parade, the San Jose Holiday Parade, the Raiders Pre-game show, and in the Hawaiian Punch Bowl, among other notable venues. After marching season, students are divided into four classes based on audition scores. Directors place students in either Intermediate, Triad, Concert, or Symphonic Band for concert season.

Selma Rotary Band Festival 
Reedley High has been participating in the Selma Rotary Band Festival since 2000. The band competition is held in Selma, CA, with the exception of the 2019 season, due to Selma’s Staley Stadium remodeling being behind schedule, the field competition was held in Kingsburg, CA at Kingsburg High school. The 2020 season was not held due to the Covid-19 Global Pandemic.

Judges scores are broken down into: 
 Music Performance (Music Performance/ Visual Performance)
 General Effect (Music Effect/ Visual Effect)
 Percussion 
 Auxiliary
 Timing/ Penalties

2000 Season [415 Band Members](Pending Scores)

2001 Season (Pending Scores)

2002 Season (Pending Scores)

2003 Season (Pending Scores)

2004 Season (Pending Scores)

2005 Season, October 29, 2005
	
Grand Sweepstakes Award 
 1st in Parade Show 
 1st in Field Show 
 3rd in Percussion Units 
 3rd in Identification (Letter) Units

[Spelled out “Redeley” out on the field by mistake from set up crew]

The 2005 season is a season to remember; this was the first Grand Sweepstakes won by Reedley High School.

2006 Season, October 28, 2006, Division A (Pending Scores)

Grand Marshall Award
 1st in Parade Performance
 1st High Musical Parade
 3rd in Identification (Letter) Units
 1st in Auxiliary (Flags)
 2nd in Field Show
 1st in General Effect Field Show

2007 Season, October 27, 2007, Division A [310 Band Members] (Pending Scores)

Grand Marshall Award

Parade:
1st in Military Drum Major
2nd in Auxiliary Flag Team
3rd in Parade Performance

Field:
1st in Field Show

[The moment Reedley set foot on the field it started to rain.]

2008 Season, October 25, 2008, Division A [320 Band Members](Pending Scores)

Parade:
 2nd Parade Show (Overall) Division A
 2nd in Drum Major Military
 3rd Auxiliary Lettering Units

Field:
 1st in Field Show
 1st in Field Show General Effect
 1st in Field Show High Music Award

2009 Season, October 31, 2009, Division A

Field Sweepstakes: 
 Visual, Scored 272.50
 Performance, Scored 91.85

Parade:
 4th in Parade Performance, Scored 89.80
 3rd in Tall Flags, Scored 84.00

Field:
 1st in Auxiliary, Scored 86.00

2010 Season, October 30, 2010, Division A

Grand Marshall Award

Parade:
 4th in Parade Performance, Scored 85.40 (1.0 Penalty)
 5th in Auxiliary (Overall), Scored 79.50
 4th in Drum Major Military, Scored 85.00
 7th in Percussion, Scored 68.30

Field:
 2nd in Field Show, Scored 88.70
 3rd in Auxiliary, Scored 81.50
 7th in Percussion, Scored 73.10

2011 Season, October 29, 2011, Division A

Grand Marshall Award

Field Sweepstakes:
 Music (Tied w/Redwood High)
 General Effect
 Band, Scored 90.95

Parade:
 3rd in Parade Performance, Scored 87.60
 6th Auxiliary (Overall), Scored 68.00
 5th Drum Major Military (Overall), Scored 84.00
 9th Percussion (Overall), Scored 68.70

Field:
 5th in Auxiliary, Scored 65.50
 9th Field Conductor, Scored 75.00
 8th Field Percussion, Scored 68.5

2012 Season, October 27, 2012, Division 5A

Parade:
 3rd in Parade Performance, Scored 85.50 (1.0 penalty)
 8th Auxiliary (Overall), Scored 67.5
 4th Military Drum Major (Overall), Scored 88.0

Field:
 3rd in Field Show, Scored 83.55
 3rd Auxiliary, Scored 65.00
 10th Percussion (Overall), 81.50
 9th Drum Major (Overall), 80.00

2013 Season, October 26, 2013, Division 5A

Parade:
 3rd Parade Performance, Scored 84.25
 2nd Auxiliary, Scored 56.25 
 3rd Military Drum Major (Overall), Scored 77
 7th in Percussion (Overall), Scored 67.5

Field:
 1st Field Show, Scored 86.70
 3rd Auxiliary, Scored 55.5
 3rd Percussion, Scored 63.8

2014 Season, October 25, 2014, Division 5A 

 3rd Parade Show 
 2nd in Drum Major Military

2015 Season, October 31, 2015, Division 5A (Parade), Division 6A (Field)

 4th Parade Show Scored 82.40
 3rd Field Show Performance Scored 83.66
 14th Auxiliary (Overall), Scored 68.20 
 12th Percussion (Overall), Scored 70.40
 7th Drum Major (Overall), Scored 84.5

2016 Season, October 29, 2016, Division 5A

Parade:
 3rd in Parade Show, Scored 79.400

Field:
 3rd in Field Show Performance, Scored 32.90
 2nd in Music Performance, Scored 172.00
 3rd in Visual Performance, Scored 157.00
 2nd in General Effect, Scored 32.80
 2nd in Music Effect, Scored 175.00
 1st in Visual Effect, Scored 153.00
 2nd in Percussion, Scored 70.50
 3rd in Auxiliary, Scored 67.50

2017 Season, October 28, 2017, Division 5A (Parade), Division 6A (Field)

Parade:
 2nd in Parade Show, Scored 78.950

Field:
 2nd in Field Show Performance, Scored 32.50
 2nd is Music Performance, Scored 171.00
 2nd in Visual Performance, Scored 154.00
 2nd in General Effect, Scored 33.00
 2nd in Music Effect, Scored 162.00
 1st in Visual Effect, Scored 168.00
 1st in Percussion, Scored 74.50
 2nd in Auxiliary, Scored 60.00

2018 Season, October 27, 2018, Division 6A
	
Grand Sweepstakes

Grand Marshall

 1st in Parade Show, Scored 89.35
 3rd in Field Performance, Scored 31.00
 2nd in Music Performance, Scored 155.00
 3rd in Visual Performance, Scored 155.00
 3rd in General Affect, Scored 33.10
 2nd in Music Effect, Scored 166.00
 3rd in Visual Effect, Scored 165.00
 2nd in Percussion, Scored 77.00
 3rd in Auxiliary, Scored 72.00

2019 Season, October 26, 2019, Division 6A [250 Band Members]
	
 4th in Parade Show, Scored 74.050
 3rd in Field Show Performance, Scored 31.50
 2nd in Music Performance, Score 163.50
 3rd in Visual Performance, Scored 151.50
 4th in General Effect, Scored 29.50
 4th in Music Effect, Score 155.50
 4th in Visual Effect, Scored 139.50
 3rd in Percussion, Scored 69.00
 3rd in Auxiliary, Scored 61.50

Choir

RHS also has an award-winning vocal program with students auditioning to be placed into the 4 singing groups, the highest being Madrigals which consists of only 8–10 singers. The RHS Madrigals traveled to New York City to compete in a music festival and received many 1st place awards.

 2017 Fall Choir Concert
 Fall Choir Concert
 2018 Winter Choir Concert

Clubs and activities

Reedley High has many clubs such as the:
 LEO Club
 Future Farmers of America (FFA)
 Naval Junior Reserve Officer Training Corp (NJROTC)
 Spanish Club
 Asian Persuasion
 Key Club
 Students for Peace
 Advancement Via Individual Determination (AVID)
 Family, Career and Community Leaders of America (FCCLA)
 Fellowship of Christian Athletes (FCA)
 Catholics in Action (C.I.A) Club
 California Scholarship Federation (CSF)
 Entre Nous
 Science Club
 German Club
 French Club
 Academic Decathlon
 Mathematics, Engineering, and Science Achievements (MESA) [possibly discontinued]
 Bilingual Club
 Computer Club
 Constitution Club
 Drama Club
 Forensics Club
 Generation Green
 Wayfarer
'R' Voice
Yearbook
Multimedia Marketing
Sports and Entertainment Marketing (introduced in 2018 school year)
Video Editing (introduced in 2018 school year)

Reedley High ASB hosts a week of events filled with activities and dress-up days during Homecoming Week, WinterFest, Spring Week, and other special events. There are also tons of things to do after school and many activities.

ASB (Associated Student Body) is in charge of running some lunch-time activities in the Reedley High School campus. ASB has introduced several new rallies in the 2019-2019 school year (also in the 2019-2020 school year):

 Back to School Rally
 Usually held a few days after the first day of school; also 2 days after the "Expectations Assembly"
 Fall Sports Rally
 Usually held midways through the Fall Sports season
 Homecoming Rally
 Usually held on the Friday of HoCo Week
 Winter Sports Rally
 Usually held midways through the Winter Sports season
 Air Guitar Rally
 Usually held the day of Air Guitar Talent Show
 Dodgeball Rally
 Usually held on the Friday of Dodgeball Week
 Spring Sports Rally
 Usually held midways through the Spring Sports season, or towards the end of the school year.

Here is a look at some of the activities ASB has done:

Air Guitar Talent Show:

 2017 Show, Rally Version
 2017 Show, Full Night Show
 2018 Show, Rally Version
 2018 Show, Full Night Show

Dodgeball Week:

 2018 Dodgeball Week

Homecoming Week:

 2017 Homecoming Week

Back to School Rally:

 2018 Back to School Rally

School publications

The school publications are:

 The Porcupine (School Yearbook) (vol. 108 for Class of 2018) (verified release)
Vol. 107 - 'PERSPECTIVE: How did you see RHS?'
Vol. 108 - 'Back in Black, Etched in Green' RHS Letterman Jacket design
 The Paragon (School Newspaper) (discontinued)
Plans are being made to revamp the school newspaper in connection to the Mid Valley Publishing group
 The Navigator (School Newsletter)
Peachjar has taken over the school newsletter 
 The Jolly Roger (School e-Newspaper)
Reedley High News (Social Media interface, third party account)
 Instagram: @ReedleyHighNews (common tags: #ReedleyHighNews)

References

External links
 ReedleyHigh.com Reedley High School Pirates
 RHSLibrary.com RHS Library
 RHSTrack.com RHS Pirate Track
 RHSFootball.com RHS Pirate Football
 RHSBasketball.com RHS Boys Basketball
 RHSGirlsBasketball RHS Girls Basketball
 KCUSD.com Kings Canyon Unified School District

High schools in Fresno County, California
Public high schools in California
1918 establishments in California

de:Reedley
nl:Reedley (Californië)
vo:Reedley